Fournes or Fournès is the name or part of the name of several communes in France:

 Fournès, in the Gard département
 Fournes-Cabardès, in the Aude département
 Fournes-en-Weppes, in the Nord département